Türkmenbaşy (Turkmen Cyrillic: Түркменбашы, Turkmen Arabic; توركمنباشی, also spelled Turkmenbashy and Turkmenbashi, the latter a back-formation of the Cyrillic Түркменбаши), formerly known as Krasnovodsk, Kyzyl-Su, and Shagadam, is a city in Balkan Province in Turkmenistan, on the Türkmenbaşy Gulf of the Caspian Sea. The population (est 2004) was 86,800, mostly ethnic Turkmens but also Russian, Armenian and Azeri minorities. As the terminus of the Trans-Caspian Railway and site of a major seaport on the Caspian, it is an important transportation center. The city is also the site of Turkmenistan's largest oil refining complex.

This city should not be confused with the similarly named town of Türkmenbaşy, formerly called Janga (Cyrillic ), also in Balkan Province, or the city of Saparmyrat Türkmenbaşy adyndaky in Daşoguz Province.

History
In 1717, Russian Prince Alexander Bekovich-Cherkassky landed and established a secret fortified settlement on this location, where the dry bed of a former mouth of the Amu-Darya River once emptied into the Caspian Sea. His intent was to march an army up this dry riverbed and conquer the Khanate of Khiva. The expedition failed, and the Russians abandoned the settlement for over 150 years.

Krasnovodsk

In 1869, the Russians invaded a second time. Having captured the settlement, they named their fort Krasnovodsk (Красноводск), which is a Russian translation of the original name, Kyzyl-Su (Red Water). The fort, Krasnovodsk, served as Imperial Russia's base of operations against Khiva and Bukhara, as well as the semi-nomadic Turkmen tribes.

The railway had originally begun from Uzun-Ada on the Caspian Sea, but the terminus was shifted north to the harbour at Krasnovodsk.

It fell to the Red Army in February 1920. 

On November 21, 1939,  was formed with its administrative center in Krasnovodsk. The oblast was repeatedly liquidated and restored (January 23, 1947, liquidated; April 4, 1952, restored; December 9, 1955, liquidated; December 27, 1973, restored; August 25, 1988, eliminated).

Türkmenbaşy
January 10, 1991, Balkan province was created, and on May 18, 1992, was designated a velayat with its capital in Balkanabat. On 8 October 1993, Krasnovodsk was renamed by President for Life Saparmurat Niyazov after his self-proclaimed title Türkmenbaşy ("Head of [all] Turkmens") by Resolution No. 904-XII of Turkmenistan Parliament.

The second President of Turkmenistan, Gurbanguly Berdimuhamedow, pledged in July 2007 to invest $1 billion in a project slated to turn Türkmenbaşy into a major tourist resort.  He ordered development of the Awaza tourist zone with 60 modern hotels to be built along a  stretch of the Caspian Sea shoreline. Aside from Awaza, Türkmenbaşy city has three modern hotels: Türkmenbaşy Hotel, Charlak Hotel, and the new Silk Road Hotel at the seaport, plus the old Soviet Hazar Hotel.

In recent years, the city has undergone large-scale reconstruction: historic district, entrance roads, vital infrastructure. A new Turkish Park and the cascade of fountains. By the end of 2012 Magtymguly Avenue had been completely renovated.  The new route merged with the city's waterfront, Bahry Hazar, and from the west motorway junction at Balykçy Traffic Circle a dual carriageway leads westward out of the city along a dike across Soymonov Bay to Turkmenbashy Airport and to Awaza. In 2014, the Oilworkers Palace of Culture, which was built in 1951, was renovated.

The city is home of the Türkmendeňizderýaýollary Agency, part of the Government of Turkmenistan.

Administrative divisions 
As of July 2013 the city of Turkmenbashy was divided into two boroughs - Awaza etraby (Avaza Borough) and Kenar etraby (Kenar Borough). Awaza etraby, an area of 9660 hectares, includes the Awaza national tourist zone, Turkmenbashi International Airport and a small residential area. Kenar etraby, an area of 7262 hectares, includes the main part of the city of Turkmenbashy and the territory of the former town of Kenar.  Each borough is headed by a presidentially appointed mayor.

Kenar Borough also encompasses the Turkmenbashi International Seaport, including the Kenar Oil Loading Terminal as well as the Kenar Oil Storage and Loading Enterprise.

Geography

Climate 
Türkmenbaşy has a cold desert climate (BWk, according to the Köppen climate classification), with hot summers and chilly winters. The average temperatures are 3 °C in January and 28 °C in July.

Economy  
Western Turkmenistan has major petroleum and natural gas reserves, and Turkmenistan's largest oil refinery is in Türkmenbaşy. The Turkmenbashy oil refinery had a refining capacity of more than 10 million tons of oil per year as of May 2016. The refinery produces a range of products, including unleaded gasoline, petroleum coke, asphalt, laundry detergent, hydro-treated diesel, and lubricating oil.  The Turkmenbashy oil refinery is Turkmenistan's largest producer of liquid petroleum gas, accounting for two-thirds of total production with annual output of about 300 thousand tonnes.

Since May 2018, the Shipbuilding and Repairing Yard Balkan has been operating in the Turkmenbashi International Seaport. The plant, the capacity of which allows to process 10,000 tons of steel per year, is calculated for the construction of 4-6 ships per year. The production facility is capable of performing maintenance and repair work on 20-30 ships, by processing 2000 tons of steel per year.

Sights 
 Museum of Regional History
 Gate to former Krasnovodsk fort
 Beaches
 Khazar Nature Reserve
 Natural History Museum

The central office of the State Archives of the Balkan Region is located in Turkmenbashi.

Religion 
The majority of city's population, Turkmens, are Sunni Muslim.

Russian Orthodox Church 
The Church of St. Michael the Archangel is a gift of the Astrakhan diocese of the Russian Orthodox Church. In 1895 it was moved to Krasnovodsk from a flooded peninsula  by Russian soldiers.

Armenian Apostolic Church 
The church was built in 1903. Currently it does not function and needs a major renovation.

Sports 
The city has Şagadam Stadium, at which is based the professional football club Şagadam FK.

International sporting events 
In 2014, first time in history Turkmenistan hosted PWA World Tour Windsurfing.

Cellular 
The city has one mobile operator : Altyn Asyr, which was implemented in 2007, and which has a 4G technology network with LTE since 2010. The 4G network covers all areas of the city and the Turkmenbashi International Airport.

Internet access services and cable TV are provided by the operator Turkmentelecom. There is 1 internet cafe in the city.

Education 
Turkmenbashi Marine Secondary Vocational School of Türkmendeňizderýaýollary Agency prepares specialists for the needs of the sea and river transport of Turkmenistan. The term of study in accordance with the specialty is 2 or 2.5 years, on a paid basis.

Culture 
In the vicinity of the city of Turkmenbashi, the shooting of Soviet feature films Days of Eclipse by Alexander Sokurov, The Forty-First by Grigory Chukhray and Barkhan by Sanzhar Babayev (in the city itself) took place.

Transport
The public transport system and the relevant infrastructure in Turkmenbashi is primarily managed by the Turkmenawtoulaglary Agency. Today, the city is served by an international airport and national rail services, municipal buses, minibuses, cabs, bike lanes.

The city is important as transport junction, formed by seaport with ferry terminal, airport and railway station. The M37 highway links the seaport to points east.  The P-18 highway runs west from the seaport to Awaza, then north to the border with Kazakhstan.

Turkmenbashi International Seaport 
Türkmenbaşy is Turkmenistan's major seaport and sea link to the West. A ferry service connects Türkmenbaşy to Baku, Azerbaijan, which is about 260 kilometers across the Caspian Sea. It is the western terminus of the Trans-Caspian railway, which connects the city to Turkmenistan's capital Ashgabat and points further east.

In 1998, as part of its three-month expedition to the Caspian Sea, the Turkmenbashi International Seaport was visited by the Cousteau Society on the Alcyone ship).

Passenger lines as of 2021 connected Turkmenbashi with the Port of Baku (Azerbaijan) and the Port of Olya (Russia).

In 2014, a sea passenger terminal for domestic routes  was opened in the port. On the internal lines, the city is connected with the Hazar and Gyzylsuw.

In 2018, a new modernized seaport was opened, the largest in the Caspian Sea. The area of the new port is over 1.3 km2, and the total length of the berth is 3.6 km. The throughput capacity of the cargo terminal is up to 18 million tons per year.

Turkmenbashi railway station 

The rail station was built in 1895 by the architect . The station building is one of the most beautiful on the entire Central Asian railway. Railway station square is adjacent to the memorial to the soldiers who died during the Great Patriotic War. From Turkmenbashi daily runs train No. 605/606 to Ashgabat.

Turkmenbashi International Airport
Initially in 1940 the airport was located at the bottom of the plateau, near Krasnovodsk Hospital. During World War II it was transferred to the top of the plateau and the airfield was collocated with a Soviet Air Force base. In 2010 the airport was reconstructed and gained international status. It has two runways. Turkmenistan Airlines provides direct flights from Turkmenbashi Airport to Ashgabat, Daşoguz, Mary, Istanbul and Türkmenabat. The airport can be reached by bus or car from the city, taking approximately 10–15 minutes by car.

Buses 
Turkmenbashi 's bus network forms a crucial backbone of the city's transit system. For almost a decade, Hyundai Aero City buses of various modifications were serving the city.

The city is also connected to Ashgabat, Balkanabat and Garabogaz by bus.

International relations

Consulates
Two consular offices are found in Türkmenbaşy.
 Consular Office of Russia
 Consulate of Kazakhstan

Twin towns – Sister cities 
 Jūrmala, Latvia

See also
 Cave of Dzhebel

References

External links 

  Krasnovodsk.net

Populated places in Balkan Region
Transcaspian Oblast
Populated places on the Caspian Sea
Populated places established in 1869
Populated coastal places in Turkmenistan
1869 establishments in the Russian Empire
Port cities and towns of the Caspian Sea